Viridichirana is a genus of moths in the subfamily Lymantriinae. The genus was erected by Ugo Dall'Asta in 1981.

Lepidoptera and Some Other Life Forms suggests that this name is a synonym of Dasychira Hübner, [1809].

Species known in Africa
Viridichirana chlorophila (Hering, 1926)
Viridichirana decellei Dall'Asta, 1981

References

Lymantriinae
Noctuoidea genera